Matt the Knife (also called MTK; born 1988) is a magician and mentalist. He has broken a number of Guinness World Records. He began his career as a professional con man.

Career
Sometime around 2000 he began to perform magic. Since then, he has performed in 17 countries across 4 continents (including television shows in the United States, China, Italy, Canada, the United Kingdom and several others).

He has probably best known for his feats of mentalism, but also often mixes sword swallowing, stunts, escapes, magic and his unique brand of humor in to his stage performances.

 he has broken 12 Guinness records. They include records for things such as escapes, sword swallowing, fire manipulation, feats of strength, and card manipulation. He usually performs these stunts for publicity or as the climax of his television specials.

In 2003 he founded a consulting firm that specializes in the prevention of fraud and cheating within the gaming industry.  He also works with corporations, security & police forces, as well as the film, literary, theatrical and television industries to create realistic characters and help develop more accurate depictions of topics involving criminal activity, the occult, the allied arts, the magical arts and mentalism.

A séance-based performance entitled "Epitaph" debuted in Rhode Island and toured in several major cities including Philadelphia, Boston, Washington DC and New Orleans.

Despite his claims that it was only intended for entertainment it has come under fire by some religious groups in the US.

Matt The Knife has been featured in The New York Post, The New York Times, ESPN Magazine, Philadelphia City Paper, PLAY Magazine, The "METRO" Paper, Road King Magazine, Escape Masters Magazine, Amusement Business Magazine, and The Wall Street Journal; as well as being on The Discovery Channel, NBC, Ripley's Believe It or Not!, CNN, The History Channel, National Geographic Channel, Adult Swim on The Cartoon Network, Guinness World Records, Sirius Satellite Radio, CCTV (China), Rai Tre (Italy) and The BBC (United Kingdom).

References

Sources
 Sideshow World Interview
 Review of MTK’s past show “Art On The Side: A Midway Menagerie”
 “Alternative Book of Records” online notation
 Detroit show review
 Show write-up

External links
 The Official Matt the Knife Website

1988 births
Living people
Mentalists
Escapologists
Sword swallowers
American magicians
American confidence tricksters